Dennis A. Rosa is an American politician who served in the Massachusetts House of Representatives until 2017. He is a Leominster resident and a member of the Democratic Party.

See also
 Massachusetts House of Representatives' 4th Worcester district

References

Living people
Democratic Party members of the Massachusetts House of Representatives
People from Leominster, Massachusetts
21st-century American politicians
Year of birth missing (living people)